New York State Route 426 (NY 426) is a state highway located entirely within Chautauqua County, New York, in the United States. NY 426 is the westernmost north–south state highway in New York.

At both crossings of the state line it continues as Pennsylvania Route 426 (PA 426). It is the only other state highway besides NY 440 that can claim the distinction of being a middle segment of another state's similarly-numbered highway. The New York alignment has remained virtually unchanged since it was assigned as part of the 1930 renumbering of state highways in New York, while the designations of the roads it connects to in Pennsylvania have varied over the years. The two segments of PA 426 were established at different times in the 1940s.

Route description

The route heads north through rural southwestern Chautauqua County to the small community known as Cutting, where it overlaps NY 474 for a tenth of a mile (0.16 km) westward before resuming its trek northward. The route follows the brook to where it converges with the creek, then parallels French Creek northward toward the waterside hamlet of French Creek. The creek and NY 426 split south of the community, with the creek continuing along French Creek–Mina Road to the hamlet while NY 426 bypasses French Creek to the west. The route enters the town of Mina upon intersecting Harrington Hill Road a mile (1.6 km) to the north.

The route follows the eastern edge of the lake north to the hamlet of Findley Lake, situated at the northern tip of the lake. The exit is the westernmost exit on NY 17; however, the expressway itself continues west to I-90 near Erie, Pennsylvania, as I-86. Past the expressway, NY 426 continues northwest for another  through nondescript terrain to the Pennsylvania state line, where it becomes the northern segment of PA 426.

History

The entirety of NY 426 was assigned as part of the 1930 renumbering of state highways in New York as a northward extension of PA 189, a short route leading south to Corry, Pennsylvania. Originally, NY 426 broke from its modern alignment at French Creek–Mina Road to serve the hamlet of French Creek via French Creek–Mina and King roads before rejoining its current route west of the hamlet. The route was realigned onto its present alignment west of French Creek . In the early 1940s, the 426 designation was extended southward into Pennsylvania as PA 426. It was also extended northwestward into Pennsylvania in the mid-1940s, effectively making NY 426 the missing segment of an otherwise discontinuous PA 426.

Major intersections

See also

References

External links

426
Transportation in Chautauqua County, New York